Thomas Bradburn may refer to:

 Tom Bradburn, Scottish cricketer
 Thomas Evans Bradburn (1853–1933), business owner and politician in Ontario, Canada.